This is a list of published works by Hans Christian Andersen. The list has been supplemented with a few important posthumous editions of his works; the year given in each entry refers to the first Danish edition. They are all in the public domain because Andersen died over 100 years ago.

Works by type

Novels 

 The Improvisatore (Improvisatoren) (1835), C.A. Reitzel Publishers
 O. T. (1836), C.A. Reitzel Publishers
 Only a Fiddler (Kun en Spillemand) (1837), C.A. Reitzel Publishers
 The Two Baronesses (De to Baronesser) (1848), C.A. Reitzel Publishers
 To be or not to be? (At være eller ikke være) (1857)
 Lucky Peer (Lykke-Peer) (1870), C.A. Reitzel Publishers
 Sorøe Gang (1935), published posthumously, unfinished
 Fragmenter af en ufuldført historisk Roman (1935), published posthumously, unfinished
 Christian den Andens Dverg (1935), published posthumously, unfinished

Children's short stories

All short stories 

A Picture Book without Pictures (Billedbog uden Billeder) series:
 "First Evening" ("Første Aften") (1839)
 "Second Evening" ("Anden Aften") (1839)
 "Third Evening" ("Tredie Aften") (1839)
 "Fourth Evening" ("Fjerde Aften") (1839)
 "Fifth Evening" ("Femte Aften") (1839)
 "Sixth Evening" ("Sjette Aften") (1839)
 "Seventh Evening" ("Syvende Aften") (1839)
 "Eighth Evening" ("Ottende Aften") (1839)
 "Ninth Evening" ("Niende Aften") (1839)
 "Tenth Evening" ("Tiende Aften") (1839)
 "Eleventh Evening" ("Ellevte Aften") (1839)
 "Twelfth Evening" ("Tolvte Aften") (1839)
 "Thirteenth Evening" ("Trettende Aften") (1839)
 "Fourteenth Evening" ("Fjortende Aften") (1839)
 "Fifteenth Evening" ("Femtende Aften") (1839)
 "Sixteenth Evening" ("Sextende Aften") (1839)
 "Seventeenth Evening" ("Syttende Aften") (1839)
 "Eighteenth Evening" ("Attende Aften") (1839)
 "Nineteenth Evening" ("Nittende Aften") (1839)
 "Twentieth Evening" ("Tyvende Aften") (1839)
 "Twenty-first Evening" ("En og tyvende Aften") (1840)
 "Twenty-second Evening" ("To og tyvende Aften" (1840)
 "Twenty-third Evening" ("Tre og tyvende Aften") (1840)
 "Twenty-fourth Evening" ("Fire og tyvende Aften") (1844)
 "Twenty-fifth Evening" ("Fem og tyvende Aften" (1840)
 "Twenty-sixth Evening" ("Sex og tyvende Aften") (1840)
 "Twenty-seventh Evening" ("Syv og tyvende Aften") (1840)
 "Twenty-eighth Evening" ("Otte og tyvende Aften") (1840)
 "Twenty-ninth Evening" ("Ni og tyvende Aften") (1840)
 "Thirtieth Evening" ("Tredivte Aften") (1840)
 "Thirty-first Evening" ("Een og tredivte Aften") (1844)
 "Thirty-second Evening" ("To og tredivte Aften") (1847)
 "Thirty-third Evening" ("Tre og tredivte Aften") (1847)
 "Den første Aften" (1943), published posthumously

Stand-alones:

 "The Tallow Candle", or "The Candlestick" ("Tællelyset") (1820s)
 "The Ghost at Palnatoke's Grave" ("Gjenfærdet ved Palnatokes Grav") (1822), as Villiam Christian Walter
 "Little Ida's Flowers" ("Den lille Idas blomster") (1835)
 "The Naughty Boy" ("Den uartige Dreng") (1835)
 "The Tinderbox" ("Fyrtøiet") (1835)
 "Little Claus and Big Claus" ("Lille Claus og store Claus") (1835)
 "The Princess and the Pea" ("Prinsessen paa Ærten") (1835)
 "The Traveling Companion" ("Reisekammeraten") (1835)
 "Thumbelina" ("Tommelise") (1835)
 "God Can Never Die" ("Den gamle Gud lever endnu") (1836)
 "This Fable is Intended for You" ("Det er Dig, Fabelen sigter til!") (1836)
 "The Talisman" ("Talismanen") (1836)
 "The Little Mermaid" ("Den lille havfrue") (1837)
 "The Emperor's New Clothes" ("Kejserens nye klæder") (1837)
 "The Wild Swans" ("De vilde svaner") (1838)
 "The Steadfast Tin Soldier" ("Den standhaftige tinsoldat") (1838)
 "The Daisy" ("Gaaseurten") (1838)
 "The Galoshes of Fortune" ("Lykkens Kalosker") (1838)
 "The Flying Trunk" ("Den flyvende Kuffert") (1839)
 "The Garden of Paradise" ("Paradisets have") (1839)
 "The Rose Elf" ("Rosen-Alfen") (1839)
 "The Storks" ("Storkene") (1839)
 "The Wicked Prince" ("Den onde Fyrste") (1840)
 "The Buckwheat" ("Boghveden") (1841)
 "Ole Lukoie" ("Ole Lukøje") (1841)
 "The Swineherd" ("Svinedrengen") (1841)
 "A Rose from Homer's Grave" ("En Rose fra Homers Grav") (1842)
 "The Metal Pig" ("Metalsvinet") (1842)
 "The Bond of Friendship" ("Venskabs-Pagten") (1842)
 "The Ugly Duckling" ("Den grimme ælling") (1843)
 "The Angel" ("Engelen") (1843)
 "The Sweethearts; or, The Top and the Ball" ("Kjærestefolkene [Toppen og bolden]") (1843)
 "The Nightingale" ("Nattergalen") (1843)
 "The Fir-Tree" ("Grantræet") (1844)
 "The Elder-Tree Mother" ("Hyldemoer") (1844)
 "The Snow Queen" ("Snedronningen") (1844)
 "Grandmother" ("Bedstemoder") (1845)
 "The Red Shoes" ("De røde Skoe") (1845)
 "The Little Match Girl" ("Den lille Pige med Svovlstikkerne") (1845)
 "The Elf Mound" ("Elverhøi") (1845)
 "Holger Danske" (1845)
 "The Shepherdess and the Chimney Sweep" ("Hyrdinden og Skorstensfejeren") (1845)
 "The Bell" ("Klokken") (1845)
 "The Jumpers" ("Springfyrene") (1845)
 "The Darning Needle" ("Stoppenaalen") (1845)
 "A Picture from the Ramparts" ("Et Billede fra Castelsvolden") (1846)
 "A View from Vartou's Window" ("Fra et Vindue i Vartou") (1846)
 "The Old Street Lamp" ("Den gamle Gadeløgte") (1847)
 "The Happy Family" ("Den lykkelige Familie") (1847)
 "The Old House" ("Det gamle Huus") (1847)
 "The Shirt Collar" ("Flipperne") (1847)
 "The Story of a Mother" ("Historien om en moder") (1847)
 "Little Tuk" ("Lille Tuk") (1847)
 "The Neighbouring Families" ("Nabofamilierne") (1847)
 "The Shadow" ("Skyggen") (1847)
 "The Drop of Water" ("Vanddraaben") (1847)
 "The Flax" ("Hørren") (1848)
 "The Phoenix Bird" ("Fugl Phønix") (1850)
 "The Silent Book" ("Den stumme Bog") (1851)
 "There is a Difference" ("'Der er Forskjel'") (1851)
 "A Story" ("En Historie") (1851)
 "The Puppet-show Man" ("Marionetspilleren") (1851)
 "The World's Fairest Rose" ("Verdens deiligste Rose") (1851)
 "The Story of the Year" ("Aarets Historie") (1852)
 "Everything in its Proper Place" ("'Alt paa sin rette Plads!'") (1852)
 "The Old Tombstone" ("Den gamle Gravsteen") (1852)
 "It's Quite True" ("Det er ganske vist!") (1852)
 "A Good Humour" ("Et godt Humeur") (1852)
 "Peas from a Pod" ("Fem fra en Ærtebælg") (1852)
 "Heartache" ("Hjertesorg") (1852)
 "She Was Good for Nothing" ("'Hun duede ikke'") (1852)
 "The Goblin and the Grocer" ("Nissen hos Spekhøkeren") (1852)
 "Thousands of Years from Now" ("Om Aartusinder") (1852)
 "On Judgement Day" ("Paa den yderste Dag") (1852)
 "The Swan's Nest" ("Svanereden") (1852)
 "Under The Willow Tree" ("Under Piletræet") (1852)
 "The Last Pearl" ("Den sidste Perle") (1853)
 "A Leaf from Heaven" ("Et Blad fra Himlen") (1853)
 "Two Maidens" ("To Jomfruer") (1853)
 "The Money Pig" ("Pengegrisen") (1854)
 "At the Uttermost Parts of the Sea" ("Ved det yderste Hav") (1854)
 "The Thorny Road of Honor" ("'Ærens Tornevei'") (1855)
 "Ib and Little Christine" ("Ib og lille Christine") (1855)
 "The Jewish Girl" ("Jødepigen") (1855)
 "Blockhead Hans", or "Clumsy Hans", or "Silly Hans", or "Jack the Dullard" ("Klods-Hans") (1855)
 "A String of Pearls" ("Et stykke Perlesnor") (1856)
 "The Bell Deep" ("Klokkedybet") (1856)
 "The Bottle Neck" ("Flaskehalsen") (1857)
 "The A-B-C Book" ("ABC-Bogen") (1858)
 "The Philosopher's Stone", or "The Stone of the Wise Man" ("De Vises Steen") (1858)
 "The Old Oak Tree's Last Dream", or "The Last Dream of the Old Oak" ("Det gamle Egetræes sidste Drøm") (1858)
 "The Marsh King's Daughter" ("Dynd-Kongens Datter") (1858)
 "The Racers" ("Hurtigløberne") (1858)
 "Something" ("'Noget'") (1858)
 "The Nightcap of the 'Pebersvend'" ("Pebersvendens Nathue") (1858)
 "Soup on a Sausage Peg" ("Suppe paa en Pølsepind") (1858)
 "Anne Lisbeth" (1859)
 "The Child in the Grave" ("Barnet i Graven") (1859)
 "Children's Prattle" ("Børnesnak") (1859)
 "'Beautiful'" ("'Deilig!'") (1859)
 "A Story from the Sand Dunes" ("En Historie fra Klitterne") (1859)
 "The Farmyard Cock and the Weathercock" ("Gaardhanen og Veirhanen") (1859)
 "Pen and Inkstand" ("Pen og Blækhuus") (1859)
 "The Girl Who Trod on the Loaf" ("Pigen, som traadte paa Brødet") (1859)
 "Ole, the Tower Keeper" ("Taarnvægteren Ole") (1859)
 "Two Brothers" ("To Brødre") (1859)
 "The Wind Tells about Valdemar Daae and His Daughters" ("Vinden fortæller om Valdemar Daae og hans Døttre") (1859)
 "Moving Day" ("Flyttedagen") (1860)
 "The Butterfly" ("Sommerfuglen") (1860)
 "The Bishop of Börglum and his Men" ("Bispen paa Børglum og hans Frænde") (1861)
 "The Old Church Bell" ("Den gamle Kirkeklokke") (1861)
 "The New Century's Goddess" ("Det nye Aarhundredes Musa") (1861)
 "What the Old Man Does is Always Right" ("Hvad Fatter gjør, det er altid det Rigtige") (1861)
 "In the Duck Yard" ("I Andegaarden") (1861)
 "The Ice-Maiden" ("Iisjomfruen") (1861)
 "The Psyche" ("Psychen") (1861)
 "The Beetle" ("Skarnbassen") (1861)
 "The Snowman" ("Sneemanden") (1861)
 "The Snail and the Rosebush" ("Sneglen og Rosenhækken") (1861)
 "The Silver Shilling" ("Sølvskillingen") (1861)
 "Twelve by the Mail" ("Tolv med Posten") (1861)
 "The Snowdrop" ("Sommergjækken") (1862)
 "The Teapot" ("Theepotten") (1863)
 "The Bird of Folklore" ("Folkesangens Fugl") (1864)
 "Golden Treasure" ("Guldskat") (1865)
 "In the Children's Room" ("I Børnestuen") (1865)
 "The Will-o'-the-Wisps are in Town", or "The Will-o'-the-Wisps are in Town, Says the Moor-woman" ("Lygtemændene ere i Byen, sagde Mosekonen") (1865)
 "The Storm Shifts the Signboards" ("Stormen flytter Skilt") (1865)
 "The Windmill" ("Veirmøllen") (1865)
 "Kept Secret but not Forgotten" ("Gjemt er ikke glemt") (1866)
 "Aunty" ("Moster") (1866)
 "The Porter's Son" ("Portnerens Søn") (1866)
 "The Toad" ("Skrubtudsen") (1866)
 "The Little Green Ones" ("De smaa Grønne") (1867)
 "The Goblin and the Woman" ("Nissen og Madamen") (1867)
 "Vänö and Glänö" ("Vænø og Glænø") (1867)
 "The Dryad" ("Dryaden") (1868)
 "Godfather's Picture Book" ("Gudfaders Billedbog") (1868)
 "Which Was the Happiest?" ("Hvem var den Lykkeligste?") (1868)
 "The Rags" ("Laserne") (1868)
 "Peiter, Peter, and Peer" ("Peiter, Peter og Peer") (1868)
 "The Days of the Week" ("Ugedagene") (1868)
 "The Court Cards" ("Herrebladene") (1869)
 "Chicken Grethe's Family" ("Hønse-Grethes Familie") (1869)
 "What One Can Invent" ("Hvad man kan hitte paa") (1869)
 "What Happened to the Thistle" ("Hvad Tidselen oplevede") (1869)
 "The Comet" ("Kometen") (1869)
 "Luck May Lie in a Pin" ("Lykken kan ligge i en Pind") (1869)
 "Sunshine Stories" ("Solskins-Historier") (1869)
 "Danish Popular Legends" ("Danske Folkesagn") (1870)
 "The Most Incredible Thing" ("Det Utroligste") (1870)
 "What the Whole Family Said" ("Hvad hele Familien sagde") (1870)
 "The Candles" ("Lysene") (1870)
 "Great-Grandfather" ("Oldefa'er") (1870)
 "Dance, Dance, Doll of Mine!" ("'Dandse, dandse Dukke min!'") (1871)
 "The Great Sea Serpent" ("Den store Søslange") (1871)
 "The Carrot Wedding" ("'Spørg Amagermo'er!'") (1871)
 "The Gardener and the Noble Family" ("Gartneren og Herskabet") (1872)
 "What Old Johanne Told" ("Hvad gamle Johanne fortalte") (1872)
 "The Cripple" ("Krøblingen") (1872)
 "The Flea and the Professor" ("Loppen og Professoren") (1872)
 "The Gate Key" ("Portnøglen") (1872)
 "Croak!" ("Qvæk") (1872)
 "The Penman" ("Skriveren") (1872)
 "Aunty Toothache" ("Tante Tandpine") (1872)

Collections and uncollected short stories 

Collections:
 First attempts (Ungdoms-Forsøg) (1822), as Villiam Christian Walter, collection of 1 play and 1 short story:
 "Gjenfærdet ved Palnatokes Grav", "Alfsol" (play)
 Fairy Tales Told for Children (Eventyr, fortalte for Børn) series:
 Fairy Tales Told for Children. First Collection. (Eventyr, fortalte for Børn. Første Samling.):
 Fairy Tales Told for Children. First Collection. First Booklet (Eventyr, fortalte for Børn. Første Samling. Første Hefte) (1835), C.A. Reitzel Publishers, collection of 4 short stories:
 "Fyrtøiet", "Lille Claus og store Claus", "Prinsessen paa Ærten", "Den lille Idas blomster"
 Fairy Tales Told for Children. First Collection. Second Booklet (Eventyr, fortalte for Børn. Første Samling. Andet Hefte) (1835), C.A. Reitzel Publishers, collection of 3 short stories:
 "Tommelise", "Den uartige Dreng", "Reisekammeraten"
 Fairy Tales Told for Children. First Collection. Third Booklet (Eventyr, fortalte for Børn. Første Samling. Tredie Hefte) (1837), C.A. Reitzel Publishers, collection of 2 short stories:
 "Den lille havfrue", "Kejserens nye klæder"
 Fairy Tales Told for Children. New Collection (Eventyr, fortalte for Børn. Ny Samling):
 Fairy Tales Told for Children. New Collection. First Booklet (Eventyr, fortalte for Børn. Ny Samling. Første Hefte) (1838), C.A. Reitzel Publisher, collection of 3 short stories:
 "Gaaseurten", "Den standhaftige tinsoldat", "De vilde svaner"
 Fairy Tales Told for Children. New Collection. Second Booklet (Eventyr, fortalte for Børn. Ny Samling. Andet Hefte) (1839), C.A. Reitzel Publisher, collection of 3 short stories:
 "Paradisets have", "Den flyvende Kuffert", "Storkene"
 Fairy Tales Told for Children. New Collection. Third Booklet (Eventyr, fortalte for Børn. Ny Samling. Tredie Hefte) (1841), C.A. Reitzel Publisher, collection of 4 short stories:
 "Ole Lukøje", "Rosen-Alfen", "Svinedrengen", "Boghveden"
 Smaahistorier (1836), collection of 3 short stories:
 "Den gamle Gud lever endnu", "Talismanen", "Det er Dig, Fabelen sigter til!"
 Three poetical works (Tre Digtninger) (1838), C.A. Reitzel Publishers, collection of 1 short story, 1 poem and 1 play:
 "Lykkens Kalosker", "En rigtig Soldat" (play), "Det har Zombien gjort" (poem)
 A Picture Book without Pictures (Billedbog uden Billeder) series:
 A Picture Book without Pictures (Billedbog uden Billeder) (1839), C.A. Reitzel Publishers, collection of 20 short stories from A Picture Book without Pictures series:
 "Første Aften" (#1), "Anden Aften" (#2), "Tredie Aften" (#3), "Fjerde Aften" (#4), "Femte Aften" (#5), "Sjette Aften" (#6), "Syvende Aften" (#7), "Ottende Aften" (#8), "Niende Aften" (#9), "Tiende Aften" (#10), "Ellevte Aften" (#11), "Tolvte Aften" (#12), "Trettende Aften" (#13), "Fjortende Aften" (#14), "Femtende Aften" (#15), "Sextende Aften" (#16), "Syttende Aften" (#17), "Attende Aften" (#18), "Nittende Aften" (#19), "Tyvende Aften" (#20)
 A Picture Book without Pictures. New Collection (Billedbog uden Billeder. Ny Samling) (1840), collection of 6 short stories from A Picture Book without Pictures series:
 "En og tyvende Aften" (#21), "Tre og tyvende Aften" (#23), "Sex og tyvende Aften" (#26), "Otte og tyvende Aften" (#28), "Ni og tyvende Aften" (#29), "Tredivte Aften" (#30)
 Tre nye Billeder af H.C. Andersen (1840), collection of 3 short stories from A Picture Book without Pictures series:
 "To og tyvende Aften" (#22), "Fem og tyvende Aften" (#25), "Syv og tyvende Aften" (#27)
 Picture Book without Pictures. Second Enhanced Edition (Billedbog uden Billeder. Anden forøgede Udgave) (1844), collection of 26 short stories from A Picture Book without Pictures series:
 "Første Aften" (#1), "Anden Aften" (#2), "Tredie Aften" (#3), "Fjerde Aften" (#4), "Femte Aften" (#5), "Sjette Aften" (#6), "Syvende Aften" (#7), "Ottende Aften" (#8), "Niende Aften" (#9), "Tiende Aften" (#10), "Ellevte Aften" (#11), "Tolvte Aften" (#12), "Trettende Aften" (#13), "Fjortende Aften" (#14), "Femtende Aften" (#15), "Sextende Aften" (#16), "Syttende Aften" (#17), "Attende Aften" (#18), "Nittende Aften" (#19), "Tyvende Aften" (#20), "En og tyvende Aften" (#21), "To og tyvende Aften" (#22), "Fire og tyvende Aften" (#24), "Fem og tyvende Aften" (#25), "Syv og tyvende Aften" (#27), "Een og tredivte Aften" (#31)
 Picture Book without Pictures. Full Version (Billedbog uden Billeder. Komplet udgave) (1847), collection of 33 short stories from A Picture Book without Pictures series:
 "Første Aften" (#1), "Anden Aften" (#2), "Tredie Aften" (#3), "Fjerde Aften" (#4), "Femte Aften" (#5), "Sjette Aften" (#6), "Syvende Aften" (#7), "Ottende Aften" (#8), "Niende Aften" (#9), "Tiende Aften" (#10), "Ellevte Aften" (#11), "Tolvte Aften" (#12), "Trettende Aften" (#13), "Fjortende Aften" (#14), "Femtende Aften" (#15), "Sextende Aften" (#16), "Syttende Aften" (#17), "Attende Aften" (#18), "Nittende Aften" (#19), "Tyvende Aften" (#20), "En og tyvende Aften" (#21), "To og tyvende Aften" (#22), "Tre og tyvende Aften" (#23), "Fire og tyvende Aften" (#24), "Fem og tyvende Aften" (#25), "Sex og tyvende Aften" (#26), "Syv og tyvende Aften" (#27), "Otte og tyvende Aften" (#28), "Ni og tyvende Aften" (#29), "Tredivte Aften" (#30), "Een og tredivte Aften" (#31), "To og tredivte Aften" (#32), "Tre og tredivte Aften" (#33)
 New Fairy Tales (Nye Eventyr) series:
 New Fairy Tales. First Volume (Nye Eventyr. Første Bind):
 New Fairy Tales. First Volume. First Collection (Nye Eventyr. Første Bind. Første Samling) (1843), C.A. Reitzel Publishers, collection of 4 short stories:
 "Engelen", "Nattergalen", "Kjærestefolkene [Toppen og bolden]", "Den grimme ælling"
 New Fairy Tales. First Volume. Second Collection (Nye Eventyr. Første Bind. Anden Samling) (1844), C.A. Reitzel Publishers, collection of 2 short stories:
 "Grantræet", "Snedronningen"
 New Fairy Tales. First Volume. Third Collection (Nye Eventyr. Første Bind. Tredie Samling) (1845), C.A. Reitzel Publishers, collection of 5 short stories:
 "Elverhøi", "De røde Skoe", "Springfyrene", "Hyrdinden og Skorstensfejeren", "Holger Danske"
 New Fairy Tales. Second Volume (Nye Eventyr. Andet Bind):
 New Fairy Tales. Second Volume. First Collection (Nye Eventyr. Andet Bind. Første Samling) (1847), C.A. Reitzel Publishers, collection of 5 short stories:
 "Den gamle Gadeløgte", "Nabofamilierne", "Stoppenaalen", "Lille Tuk", "Skyggen"
 New Fairy Tales. Second Volume. Second Collection (Nye Eventyr. Andet Bind. Anden Samling) (1848), C.A. Reitzel Publishers, collection of 6 short stories:
 "Det gamle Huus", "Vanddraaben", "Den lille Pige med Svovlstikkerne", "Den lykkelige Familie", "Historien om en moder", "Flipperne"
 To Billeder fra Kjøbenhavn (1846), collection of 2 short stories:
 "Fra et Vindue i Vartou", "Et Billede fra Castelsvolden"
 Fortællinger og Digte af H. C. Andersen (1847), collection of 2 short stories and 2 poems:
 "To og tredivte Aften" (A Picture Book without Pictures series #32), "Pigen fra Albano (Madonna! jeg næppe af glæde kan tale,)" (poem), "Tre og tredivte Aften" (A Picture Book without Pictures series #33), "Romance (Langt, langt fra hjemmets kyst)" (poem)
 Fairy-tales (Eventyr) (1849), C.A. Reitzel Publishers, collection of 43 short stories:
 "Lille Tuk", "Grantræet", "Svinedrengen", "Kjærestefolkene [Toppen og bolden]", "Hyldemoer", "Elverhøi", "Snedronningen", "Holger Danske", "Ole Lukøje", "Tommelise", "Lille Claus og store Claus", "Den standhaftige tinsoldat", "Boghveden", "Den lille havfrue", "Den uartige Dreng", "Paradisets have", "Gaaseurten", "Den grimme ælling", "Storkene", "Engelen", "Hyrdinden og Skorstensfejeren", "Prinsessen paa Ærten", "Fyrtøiet", "De røde Skoe", "Reisekammeraten", "Springfyrene", "Nattergalen", "Rosen-Alfen", "Den flyvende Kuffert", "Den gamle Gadeløgte", "Den lille Pige med Svovlstikkerne", "De vilde svaner", "Den lille Idas blomster", "Nabofamilierne", "Klokken", "Stoppenaalen", "Skyggen", "Det gamle Huus", "Hørren", "Vanddraaben", "Den lykkelige Familie", "Historien om en moder", "Flipperne"
 Stories (Historier) series:
 Stories. First Collection (Historier. Første Samling) (1852), C.A. Reitzel Publishers, collection of 7 short stories:
 "Aarets Historie", "Verdens deiligste Rose", "Et Billede fra Castelsvolden", "Paa den yderste Dag", "Det er ganske vist!", "Svanereden", "Et godt Humeur"
 Stories. Second Collection (Historier. Anden Samling) (1852), C.A. Reitzel Publishers, collection of 5 short stories:
 "Hjertesorg", "'Alt paa sin rette Plads!'", "Nissen hos Spekhøkeren", "Om Aartusinder", "Under Piletræet"
 Stories (Historier) (1855), collection of 22 short stories:
 "Ib og lille Christine", "Klods-Hans", "Fra et Vindue i Vartou", "Den gamle Gravsteen", "Fem fra en Ærtebælg", "'Hun duede ikke'", "Pengegrisen", "Ved det yderste Hav", "To Jomfruer", "'Der er Forskjel'", "Aarets Historie", "Verdens deiligste Rose", "Et Billede fra Castelsvolden", "Paa den yderste Dag", "Det er ganske vist!", "Svanereden", "Et godt Humeur", "Hjertesorg", "'Alt paa sin rette Plads!'", "Nissen hos Spekhøkeren", "Om Aartusinder", "Under Piletræet"
 New Fairy Tales and Stories (Nye Eventyr og Historier) series:
 New Fairy Tales and Stories. First Series (Nye Eventyr og Historier. Første Række):
 New Fairy Tales and Stories. First Series. First Collection (Nye Eventyr og Historier. Første Række. Første Samling) (1858), the estate and heirs of C.A. Reitzel, collection of 6 short stories:
 "Suppe paa en Pølsepind", "Flaskehalsen", "Pebersvendens Nathue", "'Noget'", "Det gamle Egetræes sidste Drøm", "ABC-Bogen"
 New Fairy Tales and Stories. First Series. Second Collection (Nye Eventyr og Historier. Første Række. Anden Samling) (1858), the estate and heirs of C.A. Reitzel, collection of 3 short stories:
 "Dynd-Kongens Datter", "Hurtigløberne", "Klokkedybet"
 New Fairy Tales and Stories. First Series. Third Collection (Nye Eventyr og Historier. Første Række. Tredie Samling) (1859), C.A. Reitzel Publishers, collection of 6 short stories:
 "Vinden fortæller om Valdemar Daae og hans Døttre", "Pigen, som traadte paa Brødet", "Taarnvægteren Ole", "Anne Lisbeth", "Børnesnak", "Et stykke Perlesnor"
 New Fairy Tales and Stories. First Series. Fourth Collection (Nye Eventyr og Historier. Første Række. Fjerde Samling) (1859), C.A. Reitzel Publishers, collection of 5 short stories:
 "Pen og Blækhuus", "Barnet i Graven", "Gaardhanen og Veirhanen", "'Deilig!'", "En Historie fra Klitterne"
 New Fairy Tales and Stories. Second Series (Nye Eventyr og Historier. Anden Række):
 New Fairy Tales and Stories. Second Series. First Collection (Nye Eventyr og Historier. Anden Række. Første Samling) (1861), C.A. Reitzel Publishers, collection of 7 short stories:
 "Tolv med Posten", "Skarnbassen", "Hvad Fatter gjør, det er altid det Rigtige", "De Vises Steen", "Sneemanden", "I Andegaarden", "Det nye Aarhundredes Musa"
 New Fairy Tales and Stories. Second Series. Second Collection (Nye Eventyr og Historier. Anden Række. Anden Samling) (1861), C.A. Reitzel Publishers, collection of 4 short stories:
 "Iisjomfruen", "Sommerfuglen", "Psychen", "Sneglen og Rosenhækken"
 New Fairy Tales and Stories. Second Series. Third Collection (Nye Eventyr og Historier. Anden Række. Tredie Samling) (1865), C.A. Reitzel Publishers, collection of 7 short stories:
 "Lygtemændene ere i Byen, sagde Mosekonen", "Veirmøllen", "Sølvskillingen", "Bispen paa Børglum og hans Frænde", "I Børnestuen", "Guldskat", "Stormen flytter Skilt"
 New Fairy Tales and Stories. Second Series. Fourth Collection (Nye Eventyr og Historier. Anden Række. Fjerde Samling) (1866), C.A. Reitzel Publishers, collection of 6 short stories:
 "Gjemt er ikke glemt", "Portnerens Søn", "Flyttedagen", "Sommergjækken", "Moster", "Skrubtudsen"
 New Fairy Tales and Stories. Third Series (Nye Eventyr og Historier. Tredie Række):
 New Fairy Tales and Stories. Third Series. New [first] Collection (Nye Eventyr og Historier. Tredie Række. Ny [første] Samling) (1872), collection of 13 short stories:
 "Gartneren og Herskabet", "Den store Søslange", "'Spørg Amagermo'er!'", "'Dandse, dandse Dukke min!'", "Hvad hele Familien sagde", "Det Utroligste", "Lysene", "Hvem var den Lykkeligste?", "Oldefa'er", "Solskins-Historier", "Ugedagene", "Kometen", "Lykken kan ligge i en Pind"
 New Fairy Tales and Stories. Third Series. Second Collection (Nye Eventyr og Historier. Tredie Række. Anden Samling) (1872), C.A. Reitzel Publishers, collection of 4 short stories:
 "Tante Tandpine", "Krøblingen", "Portnøglen", "Hvad gamle Johanne fortalte"
 Fairy Tales and Stories (Eventyr og Historier) series:
 Fairy Tales and Stories. First Volume (Eventyr og Historier. Første Bind) (1862), collection of 27 short stories:
 "Grantræet", "Fyrtøiet", "Lille Claus og store Claus", "Prinsessen paa Ærten", "Den lille Idas blomster", "Tommelise", "Den uartige Dreng", "Reisekammeraten", "Den lille havfrue", "Gaaseurten", "Den standhaftige tinsoldat", "De vilde svaner", "Paradisets have", "Den flyvende Kuffert", "Storkene", "Metalsvinet", "Venskabs-Pagten", "En Rose fra Homers Grav", "Ole Lukøje", "Rosen-Alfen", "Svinedrengen", "Boghveden", "Engelen", "Nattergalen", "Kjærestefolkene [Toppen og bolden]", "Den grimme ælling", "Snedronningen"
 Fairy Tales and Stories. Second Volume (Eventyr og Historier. Andet Bind) (1863), collection of 48 short stories and 1 article:
 "Bedstemoder", "Lille Tuk", "Fugl Phønix", "Hyldemoer", "Stoppenaalen", "Klokken", "Elverhøi", "De røde Skoe", "Springfyrene", "Hyrdinden og Skorstensfejeren", "Holger Danske", "Den lille Pige med Svovlstikkerne", "Et Billede fra Castelsvolden", "Den gamle Gadeløgte", "Nabofamilierne", "Skyggen", "Det gamle Huus", "Vanddraaben", "Den lykkelige Familie", "Historien om en moder", "Flipperne", "Hørren", "En Historie", "Den stumme Bog", "'Der er Forskjel'", "Den gamle Gravsteen", "Verdens deiligste Rose", "Aarets Historie", "Paa den yderste Dag", "Det er ganske vist!", "Svanereden", "Et godt Humeur", "Hjertesorg", "'Alt paa sin rette Plads!'", "Nissen hos Spekhøkeren", "Om Aartusinder", "Under Piletræet", "Fem fra en Ærtebælg", "Klods-Hans", "'Hun duede ikke'", "Ib og lille Christine", "To Jomfruer", "Ved det yderste Hav", "Pengegrisen", "'Ærens Tornevei'", "Jødepigen", "Flaskehalsen", "De Vises Steen", "Bemærkninger" (article)
 Fairy Tales and Stories. Third Volume (Eventyr og Historier. Tredie Bind) (1870), collection of 24 short stories:
 "Suppe paa en Pølsepind", "Pebersvendens Nathue", "'Noget'", "Det gamle Egetræes sidste Drøm", "ABC-Bogen", "Dynd-Kongens Datter", "Hurtigløberne", "Klokkedybet", "Den onde Fyrste", "Vinden fortæller om Valdemar Daae og hans Døttre", "Pigen, som traadte paa Brødet", "Taarnvægteren Ole", "Anne Lisbeth", "Børnesnak", "Et stykke Perlesnor", "Pen og Blækhuus", "Barnet i Graven", "Gaardhanen og Veirhanen", "'Deilig!'", "En Historie fra Klitterne", "Marionetspilleren", "To Brødre", "Den gamle Kirkeklokke", "Tolv med Posten"
 Fairy Tales and Stories. Fourth Volume (Eventyr og Historier. Fjerde Bind) (1871), collection of 27 short stories:
 "Skarnbassen", "Hvad Fatter gjør, det er altid det Rigtige", "Sneemanden", "I Andegaarden", "Det nye Aarhundredes Musa", "Iisjomfruen", "Sommerfuglen", "Psychen", "Sneglen og Rosenhækken", "Lygtemændene ere i Byen, sagde Mosekonen", "Veirmøllen", "Sølvskillingen", "Bispen paa Børglum og hans Frænde", "I Børnestuen", "Guldskat", "Stormen flytter Skilt", "Theepotten", "Folkesangens Fugl", "De smaa Grønne", "Nissen og Madamen", "Peiter, Peter og Peer", "Gjemt er ikke glemt", "Portnerens Søn", "Flyttedagen", "Sommergjækken", "Moster", "Skrubtudsen"
 Fairy Tales and Stories. Fifth Volume (Eventyr og Historier. Femte Bind) (1874), collection of 25 short stories and 1 article:
 "Bemærkninger til Eventyr og Historier" (article), "Gudfaders Billedbog", "Laserne", "Vænø og Glænø", "Hvem var den Lykkeligste?", "Dryaden", "Hønse-Grethes Familie", "Hvad Tidselen oplevede", "Hvad man kan hitte paa", "Lykken kan ligge i en Pind", "Kometen", "Ugedagene", "Solskins-Historier", "Oldefa'er", "Lysene", "Det Utroligste", "Hvad hele Familien sagde", "'Dandse, dandse Dukke min!'", "'Spørg Amagermo'er!'", "Den store Søslange", "Gartneren og Herskabet", "Loppen og Professoren", "Hvad gamle Johanne fortalte", "Portnøglen", "Krøblingen", "Tante Tandpine"
 Fifteen Fairy Tales and Stories (Femten Eventyr og Historier) (1867), C.A. Reitzel Publishers, collection of 15 short stories:
 "Tolv med Posten", "Barnet i Graven", "Suppe paa en Pølsepind", "Anne Lisbeth", "'Noget'", "Hurtigløberne", "Pebersvendens Nathue", "ABC-Bogen", "Sneemanden", "Klokkedybet", "Skarnbassen", "Psychen", "Hvad Fatter gjør, det er altid det Rigtige", "Børnesnak", "Pen og Blækhuus"
 Three new Fairy Tales and Stories (Tre nye Eventyr og Historier) (1869), C.A. Reitzel Publishers, collection of 3 short stories:
 "Hønse-Grethes Familie", "Hvad Tidselen oplevede", "Hvad man kan hitte paa"
 Fairy Tales and Stories. New Collection (Eventyr og Historier. Ny Samling) (1872), C.A. Reitzel Publishers, collection of 12 short stories:
 "Kometen", "Ugedagene", "Solskins-Historier", "Oldefa'er", "Hvem var den Lykkeligste?", "Lysene", "Det Utroligste", "Hvad hele Familien sagde", "'Dandse, dandse Dukke min!'", "'Spørg Amagermo'er!'", "Den store Søslange", "Gartneren og Herskabet"
 To ukendte Eventyr af H. C. Andersen (1926), published posthumously, collection of 2 short stories:
 "Qvæk", "Skriveren"

Uncollected short stories:
 "The Tallow Candle", or "The Candlestick" ("Tællelyset") (1820s)
 "The Last Pearl" ("Den sidste Perle") (1853)
 "A Leaf from Heaven" ("Et Blad fra Himlen") (1853)
 "The Court Cards" ("Herrebladene") (1869)
 "Danish Popular Legends" ("Danske Folkesagn") (1870)
 "Den første Aften" (1943), published posthumously, A Picture Book without Pictures series #34

Poems 

 Skjærmbræts-Billeder (1829), collection of 5 poems
 Poems (Digte) (1830), collection of 47 poems
 Prøve af 'Phantasier og Skizzer (1830), collection of 3 poems
 Tre Smaae-Digte (1830), collection of 3 poems
 Tvende Smaadigte (1830), collection of 2 poems
 Deviser med Presenterne paa et Juletræe (1831), collection of 7 poems
 Phantasies and sketches (Phantasier og Skizzer) (1831), collection of 50 poems
 Poetiske Penneprøver (1831), collection of 6 poems
 Vignettes for Danish poets (Vignetter til danske Digtere) (1831), C.A. Reitzel Publishers, collection of 67 poems
 Poetiske Bagateller (1832), collection of 6 poems
 The twelve months of the year drawn in ink (Aarets tolv Maaneder, Tegnede med Blæk og Pen) (1832), C.A. Reitzel Publishers, collection of 12 poems
 Collected poems (Samlede Digte) (1833), C.A. Reitzel Publishers, collection of 68 poems
 Smaae-Digte (1833), collection of 7 poems
 Digte af H. C. Andersen series:
 Digte af H. C. Andersen I (1834), collection of 3 poems
 Digte af H. C. Andersen II (1835), collection of 5 poems
 Digte af H. C. Andersen III (1836), collection of 2 poems
 Digte af H. C. Andersen IV (1844), collection of 5 poems
 Digte af H. C. Andersen V (1844), collection of 4 poems
 Digte af H. C. Andersen VI (1862), collection of 4 poems
 Smaa-Digte af H. C. Andersen (1835), collection of 2 poems
 Sange ved det Søsterlige Velgjørenheds Selskabs høitidelige Forsamling i Anledning af Hendes Majestæt Dronning Maria Sophia Frederikas høie Fødselsdag den 28de October 1838 (1838), collection of 2 songs
 Smaavers af H. C. Andersen series:
 Smaavers af H. C. Andersen I (1840), collection of 3 poems
 Smaavers af H. C. Andersen II (1844), collection of 5 poems
 Smaavers af H. C. Andersen III (1867), collection of 4 poems
 Smaavers af H. C. Andersen IV (1872), collection of 2 poems
 Sange af Vaudevillen: 'Fuglen i Pæretræet (1844), collection of 6 poems
 Poems old and new (Digte, gamle og nye) (1846), C.A. Reitzel Publishers, collection of 92 poems
 6 character studies composed for pianoforte (6 Characteerstykker componerede som Studier for Pianoforte) (1849), C.C. Lose & Delbanco, Copenhagen, book of 6 sheet music with poems
 Indledende Smaavers series:
 6 indledende Smaavers (1849), collection of 6 poems
 6 indledende Smaavers II (1850), collection of 6 poems
 A Christmas greeting for adults and children from Danish composers (Julehilsen til Store og Smaae fra danske Componister) (1850), C.C. Lose & Delbanco, Copenhagen, book of 6 sheet music with poems
 Patriotic verses and songs from the War (Fædrelandske Vers og Sange under Krigen) (1851), collection of 14 poems
 Indledende Smaavers (1855), collection of 6 poems
 Six short pieces for pianoforte (Novellette i sex Smaastykker for Pianoforte) (1855), C.C. Lose & Delbanco, book of 6 sheet music with poems
 Digte fra Spanien (1863), collection of 6 poems
 6 Smaarim (1866), collection of 6 poems
 Photographs of groups of children (Fotograferede Børnegrupper) (1866), book of 6 photographs with poems
 Well-known and forgotten poems (Kjendte og glemte Digte) (1867), C.A. Reitzel Publishers, collection of 42 poems
 To Digte af H. C. Andersen (1875), collection of 2 poems, published posthumously
 Tre utrykte Digte af H. C. Andersen (1878), collection of 3 poems, published posthumously
 Tre ufuldførte historiske Digtninge (1955), collection of 3 poems, published posthumously

 Plays 

 Røverne i Vissenbjerg i Fyen (1822)
 Love in Nicolai Tower or What says the pit (Kjærlighed paa Nicolai Taarn eller Hvad siger Parterret) (1829), C.A. Reitzel Publishers, Copenhagen
 Fornuftgiftermaalet Nr. 2. En Dramatisk Drøm paa Skagens Rev (1831)
 The ship (Skibet) (1831), C.A. Reitzel Publishers
 The bride of Lammermoor (Bruden fra Lammermoor) (1832), opera
 The raven or the fraternal test (Ravnen eller Broderprøven) (1832), Schubothske Boghandel, Copenhagen, opera
 Agnete and the Merman (Agnete og Havmanden) (1833)
 The queen of 16 (Dronningen paa 16 Aar) (1833)
 Songs from the party at Kenilworth (Sangene i Festen paa Kenilworth) (1836), C.A. Reitzel Publishers, opera
 Parting and meeting. Original drama in two parts. First part: The Spaniards in Odense. Vaudeville in one act. Second part: Twenty-five years later. Vaudeville in one act (Skilles og mødes. Original dramatisk Digtning i to Afdelinger. Første Afdeling: Spanierne i Odense. Vaudeville i een Act. Anden Afdeling: Fem og tyve Aar derefter. Vaudeville i een Act) (1836), Schubothe Publishers
 The invisible person on Sprogø (Den Usynlige paa Sprogø) (1839), Schubothes Boghandling
 An open-air comedy; vaudeville in one act based on the old ballad opera: "Actor against his Will" (En Comedie i det Grønne, Vaudeville i een Akt efter det gamle Lystspil: "Skuespilleren imod sin Villie") (1840)
 The Moorish Girl (Maurerpigen) (1840)
 Mikkels Kjærligheds Historier i Paris (1840)
 The Mulatto (Mulatten) (1840)
 Vandring gjennem Opera-Galleriet (1841), opera
 The king dreams (Kongen drømmer) (1844)
 The flower of happiness (Lykkens Blomst) (1845), C.A. Reitzel Publishers
 Little Kirsten (Liden Kirsten) (1846), opera
 Ahasverus (1847), C.A. Reitzel Publishers
 The Dannevirke of art (Kunstens Dannevirke) (1848), C.A. Reitzel Publishers
 The wedding at Lake Como (Brylluppet ved Como-Søen) (1849), C.A. Reitzel Publishers, opera
 More than pearls and gold (Meer end Perler og Guld) (1849), C.A. Reitzel Publishers
 Den nye Barselstue (1850), C.A. Reitzel Publishers
 A night in Roskilde (En Nat i Roeskilde) (1850), C.A. Reitzel Publishers
 Ole Lukoie (Ole Lukøje) (1850), C.A. Reitzel Publishers
 The Elder Tree Mother (Hyldemoer) (1851), C.A. Reitzel Publishers
 The Nix (Nøkken) (1853), C.A. Reitzel Publishers, opera
 Fuglen i Pæretræet (1854)
 Indledning til Carnevalet (1854)
 A village story (En Landsbyhistorie) (1855), the estate and heirs of C.A. Reitzel
 He is not [nobly] born (Han er ikke født) (1864), C.A. Reitzel Publishers
 On Langebro (Paa Langebro) (1864), C.A. Reitzel Publishers
 When the Spaniards Were Here (Da Spanierne var her) (1865), C.A. Reitzel Publishers
 The Raven (Ravnen) (1865), C.A. Reitzel Publishers, opera
 Kong Saul (1867), opera
 I Vetturinens Vogn (1868)
 Festen paa Kenilworth (1876), published posthumously
 Intermediet til Holbergs: Kilderejsen (1883), published posthumously
 Hr. Rasmussen (1913), published posthumously
 Danmark (1937), published posthumously
 Truth (1940), published posthumously
 Sangerinden (1987), published posthumously
 I Maaneskin (2001), published posthumously
 Langebro (2001), published posthumously
 Souffleurens Benefice (2001), published posthumously
 En Ødeland (2003), published posthumously
 Skovcapellet (2004), published posthumously

 Non-fiction 

Articles

 "Til Kjøbenhavns-Postens Læsere, i Anledning af Herr XXX's Critik over: 'Kjærlighed paa Nicolai Taa'" (1829)
 "Et Stykke Kage til den lille XXX, for hans Ricochets mod Hr. Andersen af 'En Beundrer af XXX'" (1829)
 "Subscriptionsplan. Digte (1830)" (1829)
 "Subskriptionsplan til 'Phantasier og Skizzer'" (1830)
 "Uddrag af et Privatbrev fra Paris, dateret 11te Juni 1833" (1833)
 "Fortale til Agnete og Havmanden" (1833)
 "Fortale til Subskriptionsindbydelse paa 'Improvisatoren'" (1834)
 "Erklæring i Anledning af Kritik i A. P. Berggreens i 'Musikalsk Tidende', Nr. 7 af 'Poetisk Jydepotte' fremsagt ved Hr. Sahlertz" (1836)
 "Anmeldelse af H. C. Ørsteds Foredrag" (1839)
 "Fortale af H. C. Andersen, til 'Konstnerfamilien'" (1841)
 "De Svenske i Fyen i Sommeren 1848" (1848)
 "'Midsommar-Resan'. En Vall-Fart af Förf. til Teckningar ur hvardagslifvet" (1849)
 "Et Par Ord om 'Hyldemoer'" (1851)
 "Berigtigelse af en Fejl i 'Mit Livs Eventyr'" (1856)
 "Af et Brev fra London. (Juli 1857)" (1857)
 "Protest til Redacteur Ploug mod Clemens Petersens Anmeldelse i 'Fædrelandet' af af Carit Etlars Folkekomedie 'Hr. Lauge med den" (1861)
 "Brev fra Prof. H. C. Andersen, dateret Florents den 3 juni" (1861)
 "Brudstykke af et Brev fra Spanien" (1862)
 "Brudstykke af et Brev, dateret Valencia, den 18de September" (1862)
 "Brudstykke af et Brev dateret Granada den 12. Oktober" (1862)
 "Brudstykke af et Brev dateret Tanger den 3. November" (1862)
 "Brudstykke af et Brev dateret Madrid den 18. December" (1862)
 "Bemærkninger" (1863)
 "Uddrag af et Brev, dateret Leyden, den 17. Marts" (1866)
 "Af et Brev fra H. C. Andersen, dateret Lissabon, den 16. Mai" (1866)
 "Uddrag af et Brev, omhandlende Rejsen til Portugal" (1866)
 "Fra H. C. Andersens Reise. Brev dateret Setubal den 19de Juni 1866" (1866)
 "Brudstykke af et Brev dateret Cintra den 31. Juli" (1866)
 "Svarskrivelse til Odense Kommunalbestyrelse paa Indbydelsen til at komme til Odense den 6/12 for at modtage Diplomet som Æresbor" (1867)
 "Takketale ved Overrækkelsen af Diplomet" (1867)
 "Brev, dateret København d. 2den Januar 1867. (poetico for: 1868)" (1867)
 "Takskrivelse til Studenterforeningen" (1867)
 "Bemærkninger" (1868)
 "Et Brev fra Etatsraad H. C. Andersen til Udgiveren" (1869)
 "Brev dateret Rom, den 5te December 1833" (1870)
 "Brev dateret Kjøbenhavn, den 15de September 1836" (1870)
 "Uddrag af et Brev til Edmund W. Gosse" (1874)
 "H. C. Andersen og de amerikanske Børn" (1874)
 "Bemærkninger til Eventyr og Historier" (1874)
 "Til mine Landsmænd" (1875)
 "Brev, dateret: Kjøbenhavn, den 5te April 1875, til Redaktøren af 'Søndags-Posten'" (1875)
 "Et Curiosum fra 1822" (1875), published posthumously

Autobiographies
 The Fairy Tale of My Life (Mit eget Eventyr uden Digtning) (1847)
 The Fairy Tale of My Life (Mit Livs Eventyr) (1855)
 The Story of My Life (1871)
 H.C. Andersens Samlede Skrifter. Supplement til 'Mit Livs Eventyr''' (1877), published posthumously

Biographies
 En Episode af Ole Bulls Liv (1839)
 Bertel Thorvaldsen. En biographisk Skizze (1844)
 Henriette Hanck (1845)
 Jens Adolph Jerichau og Elisabeth Jerichau, født Baumann (1853)
 Johan Peter Emilius Hartmann (1860)
 Digteren Bernhard Severin Ingemann (1862)

Essays
 Samlede Skrifter af H. C. Andersen series:
 Samlede Skrifter af H. C. Andersen. Første Bind (1853)
 Samlede Skrifter af H. C. Andersen. Andet Bind (1853)
 Samlede Skrifter af H. C. Andersen. Tredie Bind (1853)
 Samlede Skrifter af H. C. Andersen. Fjerde Bind (1853)
 Samlede Skrifter af H. C. Andersen. Femte Bind (1854)
 Samlede Skrifter af H. C. Andersen. Sjette Bind (1854)
 Samlede Skrifter af H. C. Andersen. Syvende Bind (1854)
 Samlede Skrifter af H. C. Andersen. Ottende Bind (1854)
 Samlede Skrifter af H. C. Andersen. Niende Bind (1854)
 Samlede Skrifter af H. C. Andersen. Tiende Bind (1854)
 Samlede Skrifter af H. C. Andersen. Ellevte Bind (1854)
 Samlede Skrifter af H. C. Andersen. Tolvte Bind (1854)
 Samlede Skrifter af H. C. Andersen. Trettende Bind (1854)
 Samlede Skrifter af H. C. Andersen. Fjortende Bind (1854)
 Samlede Skrifter af H. C. Andersen. Femtende Bind (1854)
 Samlede Skrifter af H. C. Andersen. Sextende Bind (1854)
 Samlede Skrifter af H. C. Andersen. Syttende Bind (1855)
 Samlede Skrifter af H. C. Andersen. Attende Bind (1855)
 Samlede Skrifter af H. C. Andersen. Nittende Bind (1855)
 Samlede Skrifter af H. C. Andersen. Tyvende Bind (1855)
 Samlede Skrifter af H. C. Andersen. Eet og Tyvende og To og Tyvende Bind (1855)
 Samlede Skrifter af H. C. Andersen. Tre og Tyvende Bind (1857)
 Samlede Skrifter af H. C. Andersen. Fire og Tyvende Bind (1863)
 Samlede Skrifter af H. C. Andersen. Fem og Tyvende Bind (1868)
 Samlede Skrifter af H. C. Andersen. Sex og Tyvende Bind (1868)
 Samlede Skrifter af H. C. Andersen. Syv og Tyvende Bind (1868)
 Samlede Skrifter af H. C. Andersen. Otte og Tyvende Bind (1868)
 Samlede Skrifter af H. C. Andersen. Ni og Tyvende Bind (1876), published posthumously
 Samlede Skrifter af H. C. Andersen. Tredivte Bind (1876), published posthumously
 Samlede Skrifter af H. C. Andersen. En og Tredivte Bind (1876), published posthumously
 Samlede Skrifter af H. C. Andersen. To og Tredivte Bind (1876), published posthumously
 Samlede Skrifter af H. C. Andersen. Tre og Tredivte Bind (1879), published posthumously
 H.C. Andersen. Samlede Skrifter. Anden Udgave (1880), published posthumously

Religion
 Psalmer ved første Gudstjeneste i Holmens Kirke (1836)

Satire and humor
 Et kjøbenhavnsk Eventyr Nytaarsnat (1829)
 Tanker over et Nul (1829)
 Tanker over nogle gamle forslidte Skoe (1830)
 Aphorismer efter Lichtenberg, Jean Paul og L. Börne (1830)
 En Samling Digterblomster og Aforismer af forskellige Forfattere (1830)
 En geographisk Beskrivelse af det menneskelige Hoved (1832)
 Akrostichon-Gaade. To danske Digteres Navne (1875)

Travelogues

 Fragment af en Reise fra Roeskilde til Helsingør (1826)
 Brudstykke af en Udflugt i Sommeren 1829. Odense og dens Omegn (1829)
 A journey on foot from Holmens Canal to the east point of Amager in the years 1828 and 1829 (Fodreise fra Holmens Canal til Østpynten af Amager i Aarene 1828 og 1829) (1829)
 Rambles in the Romantic Regions of the Hartz Mountains, Saxon Switzerland, &c. (Skyggebilleder af en Reise til Harzen, det sachsiske Schweiz etc. etc., i Sommeren 1831) (1831), C.A. Reitzel Publishers
 Raphaels Begravelse (1835)
 Blade af min Dagbog (1835)
 Thorvaldsen (1835)
 En Spadseretour gjennem Posilip-Grotten ved Neapel (1835)
 Italiensk Musik, Sang og Theatervæsen (1835)
 Den fattige Dreng paa Frankerigs Throne (1836)
  'Mohammeds Fødselsdag' og 'Jernbanen'  (1841)
 Tre romerske Drenge (1842)
 A Poet's Bazaar (En Digters Bazar) (1842), C.A. Reitzel Publishers
 I Sverrig (1851), C.A. Reitzel Publishers
 Silkeborg (1853)
 Ragaz (Bad-Pfäffers) (1858)
 Skagen (1859)
 Et Besøg hos Charles Dickens i Sommeren 1857 (1860)
 Liden Kirstens Grav (1860)
 Passionskuespillet i Oberammergau i 1860 (1860)
 Brudstykke af en Reise i Schweitz (Meddeelt til Billedet: Løven ved Luzern) (1861)
 In Spain (I Spanien) (1863), C.A. Reitzel Publishers
 A Visit to Portugal (Et Besøg i Portugal 1866) (1868), C.A. Reitzel Publishers
 I Jurabjergene (1869)
 Nürnberg. En Reise-Erindring fra Foraaret 1872 (1872)
 Et Blad, skrevet i Norge (1949), published posthumously
 Et Kapitel af en paatænkt historisk Sverigesroman (1964), published posthumously

Writing
 Den skjønne Grammatica, eller Badens latinske Grammatik (1831)

 Works by year 

 1820s 

 "The Tallow Candle", or "The Candlestick" ("Tællelyset") (1820s), this is Andersen's first fairy tale, written while he was still in school and dedicated to "Mme. Bunkeflod, one of his early benefactors."
 First attempts (Ungdoms-Forsøg) (1822), as Villiam Christian Walter, collection of 1 play and 1 short story, published at the author's expense:
 "Gjenfærdet ved Palnatokes Grav", "Alfsol" (play)
 Røverne i Vissenbjerg i Fyen (1822), play
 Fragment af en Reise fra Roeskilde til Helsingør (1826), travelogue
 Skjærmbræts-Billeder (1829), collection of 5 poems
 Love in Nicolai Tower or What says the pit (Kjærlighed paa Nicolai Taarn eller Hvad siger Parterret) (1829), C.A. Reitzel Publishers, Copenhagen, heroic vaudeville in one act
 "Til Kjøbenhavns-Postens Læsere, i Anledning af Herr XXX's Critik over: 'Kjærlighed paa Nicolai Taa'" (1829), article
 "Et Stykke Kage til den lille XXX, for hans Ricochets mod Hr. Andersen af 'En Beundrer af XXX'" (1829), article
 "Subscriptionsplan. Digte (1830)" (1829), article
 Et kjøbenhavnsk Eventyr Nytaarsnat (1829), satire and humor
 Tanker over et Nul (1829), satire and humor
 Brudstykke af en Udflugt i Sommeren 1829. Odense og dens Omegn (1829), travelogue
 A journey on foot from Holmens Canal to the east point of Amager in the years 1828 and 1829 (Fodreise fra Holmens Canal til Østpynten af Amager i Aarene 1828 og 1829) (1829), travelogue, published at the author's expense

 1830s 

 Poems (Digte) (1830), published at the author's expense, collection of 47 poems
 Prøve af 'Phantasier og Skizzer (1830), collection of 3 poems
 Tre Smaae-Digte (1830), collection of 3 poems
 Tvende Smaadigte (1830), collection of 2 poems
 "Subskriptionsplan til 'Phantasier og Skizzer'" (1830), article
 Tanker over nogle gamle forslidte Skoe (1830), satire and humor
 Aphorismer efter Lichtenberg, Jean Paul og L. Börne (1830), satire and humor
 En Samling Digterblomster og Aforismer af forskellige Forfattere (1830), satire and humor
 Deviser med Presenterne paa et Juletræe (1831), collection of 7 poems
 Phantasies and sketches (Phantasier og Skizzer) (1831), published at the author's expense, collection of 50 poems
 Poetiske Penneprøver (1831), collection of 6 poems
 Vignettes for Danish poets (Vignetter til danske Digtere) (1831), C.A. Reitzel Publishers, collection of 67 poems
 Fornuftgiftermaalet Nr. 2. En Dramatisk Drøm paa Skagens Rev (1831), play
 The ship (Skibet) (1831), C.A. Reitzel Publishers, a vaudeville in one act, based on Scribe's and Mazere's "La Quarantaine"
 Rambles in the Romantic Regions of the Hartz Mountains, Saxon Switzerland, &c. (Skyggebilleder af en Reise til Harzen, det sachsiske Schweiz etc. etc., i Sommeren 1831) (1831), C.A. Reitzel Publishers, travelogue
 Den skjønne Grammatica, eller Badens latinske Grammatik (1831), writing
 The bride of Lammermoor (Bruden fra Lammermoor) (1832), F. Prinzlau Publishers, Copenhagen, original romantic ballad opera in four acts
 The raven or the fraternal test (Ravnen eller Broderprøven) (1832), Schubothske Boghandel, Copenhagen, magic opera in three acts, based on Gozzi's tragicomic fairy tale
 Poetiske Bagateller (1832), collection of 6 poems
 The twelve months of the year drawn in ink (Aarets tolv Maaneder, Tegnede med Blæk og Pen) (1832), C.A. Reitzel Publishers, collection of 12 poems
 En geographisk Beskrivelse af det menneskelige Hoved (1832), satire and humor
 Agnete and the Merman (Agnete og Havmanden) (1833), published at the author's expense, dramatic poem
 The queen of 16 (Dronningen paa 16 Aar) (1833), drama in two acts, a free translation of Bayard's "La reine de seize ans", Schubothske Boghandel, appeared as no. 47 of Det Kongelige Theaters Repertoire (The Royal Theatre repertoire), 2nd part
 Collected poems (Samlede Digte) (1833), C.A. Reitzel Publishers, collection of 68 poems
 Smaae-Digte (1833), collection of 7 poems
 "Uddrag af et Privatbrev fra Paris, dateret 11te Juni 1833" (1833), article
 "Fortale til Agnete og Havmanden" (1833), article
 Digte af H. C. Andersen I (1834), collection of 3 poems
 "Fortale til Subskriptionsindbydelse paa 'Improvisatoren'" (1834), article
 The Improvisatore (Improvisatoren) (1835), C.A. Reitzel Publishers, novel
 Fairy Tales Told for Children. First Collection. First Booklet (Eventyr, fortalte for Børn. Første Samling. Første Hefte) (1835), C.A. Reitzel Publishers, collection of 4 short stories:
 "Fyrtøiet", "Lille Claus og store Claus", "Prinsessen paa Ærten", "Den lille Idas blomster"
 Fairy Tales Told for Children. First Collection. Second Booklet (Eventyr, fortalte for Børn. Første Samling. Andet Hefte) (1835), C.A. Reitzel Publishers, collection of 3 short stories:
 "Tommelise", "Den uartige Dreng", "Reisekammeraten"
 Digte af H. C. Andersen II (1835), collection of 5 poems
 Smaa-Digte af H. C. Andersen (1835), collection of 2 poems
 Raphaels Begravelse (1835), travelogue
 Blade af min Dagbog (1835), travelogue
 Thorvaldsen (1835), travelogue
 En Spadseretour gjennem Posilip-Grotten ved Neapel (1835), travelogue
 Italiensk Musik, Sang og Theatervæsen (1835), travelogue
 O. T. (1836), C.A. Reitzel Publishers, original novel in two parts
 Smaahistorier (1836), collection of 3 short stories:
 "Den gamle Gud lever endnu", "Talismanen", "Det er Dig, Fabelen sigter til!"
 Digte af H. C. Andersen III (1836), collection of 2 poems
 Songs from the party at Kenilworth (Sangene i Festen paa Kenilworth) (1836), C.A. Reitzel Publishers, a romantic opera in three acts
 Parting and meeting. Original drama in two parts. First part: The Spaniards in Odense. Vaudeville in one act. Second part: Twenty-five years later. Vaudeville in one act (Skilles og mødes. Original dramatisk Digtning i to Afdelinger. Første Afdeling: Spanierne i Odense. Vaudeville i een Act. Anden Afdeling: Fem og tyve Aar derefter. Vaudeville i een Act) (1836), Schubothe Publishers, appeared as no. 76 of Det Kongelige Theaters Repertoire, 4th part
 "Erklæring i Anledning af Kritik i A. P. Berggreens i 'Musikalsk Tidende', Nr. 7 af 'Poetisk Jydepotte' fremsagt ved Hr. Sahlertz" (1836), article
 Psalmer ved første Gudstjeneste i Holmens Kirke (1836), religion
 Den fattige Dreng paa Frankerigs Throne (1836), travelogue
 Only a Fiddler (Kun en Spillemand) (1837), C.A. Reitzel Publishers, novel in three volumes
 Fairy Tales Told for Children. First Collection. Third Booklet (Eventyr, fortalte for Børn. Første Samling. Tredie Hefte) (1837), C.A. Reitzel Publishers, collection of 2 short stories:
 "Den lille havfrue", "Kejserens nye klæder"
 Fairy Tales Told for Children. New Collection. First Booklet (Eventyr, fortalte for Børn. Ny Samling. Første Hefte) (1838), C.A. Reitzel Publisher, collection of 3 short stories:
 "Gaaseurten", "Den standhaftige tinsoldat", "De vilde svaner"
 Three poetical works (Tre Digtninger) (1838), C.A. Reitzel Publishers, collection of 1 short story, 1 poem and 1 play:
 "Lykkens Kalosker", "En rigtig Soldat" (short one act verse play), "Det har Zombien gjort" (poem)
 Sange ved det Søsterlige Velgjørenheds Selskabs høitidelige Forsamling i Anledning af Hendes Majestæt Dronning Maria Sophia Frederikas høie Fødselsdag den 28de October 1838 (1838), collection of 2 songs
 Fairy Tales Told for Children. New Collection. Second Booklet (Eventyr, fortalte for Børn. Ny Samling. Andet Hefte) (1839), C.A. Reitzel Publisher, collection of 3 short stories:
 "Paradisets have", "Den flyvende Kuffert", "Storkene"
 A Picture Book without Pictures (Billedbog uden Billeder) (1839), C.A. Reitzel Publishers, collection of 20 short stories from A Picture Book without Pictures series:
 "Første Aften" (#1), "Anden Aften" (#2), "Tredie Aften" (#3), "Fjerde Aften" (#4), "Femte Aften" (#5), "Sjette Aften" (#6), "Syvende Aften" (#7), "Ottende Aften" (#8), "Niende Aften" (#9), "Tiende Aften" (#10), "Ellevte Aften" (#11), "Tolvte Aften" (#12), "Trettende Aften" (#13), "Fjortende Aften" (#14), "Femtende Aften" (#15), "Sextende Aften" (#16), "Syttende Aften" (#17), "Attende Aften" (#18), "Nittende Aften" (#19), "Tyvende Aften" (#20)
 The invisible person on Sprogø (Den Usynlige paa Sprogø) (1839), Schubothes Boghandling, dramatic joke in one act, with choruses and songs, appeared as no. 113 of Det Kongelige Theaters Repertoire, 5th part
 "Anmeldelse af H. C. Ørsteds Foredrag" (1839), article
 En Episode af Ole Bulls Liv (1839), biography

 1840s 

 A Picture Book without Pictures. New Collection (Billedbog uden Billeder. Ny Samling) (1840), collection of 6 short stories from A Picture Book without Pictures series:
 "En og tyvende Aften" (#21), "Tre og tyvende Aften" (#23), "Sex og tyvende Aften" (#26), "Otte og tyvende Aften" (#28), "Ni og tyvende Aften" (#29), "Tredivte Aften" (#30)
 Tre nye Billeder af H.C. Andersen (1840), collection of 3 short stories from A Picture Book without Pictures series:
 "To og tyvende Aften" (#22), "Fem og tyvende Aften" (#25), "Syv og tyvende Aften" (#27)
 An open-air comedy; vaudeville in one act based on the old ballad opera: "Actor against his Will" (En Comedie i det Grønne, Vaudeville i een Akt efter det gamle Lystspil: "Skuespilleren imod sin Villie") (1840), appeared as no. 124 of Det Kongelige Theaters Repertoire, 6th part
 The Moorish Girl (Maurerpigen) (1840), original tragedy in five acts, published at the author's expense
 Mikkels Kjærligheds Historier i Paris (1840), play
 The Mulatto (Mulatten) (1840), original romantic drama, published at the author's expense (2nd imprint one month later, also 1840, C.A. Reitzel Publishers)
 Smaavers af H. C. Andersen I (1840), collection of 3 poems
 Fairy Tales Told for Children. New Collection. Third Booklet (Eventyr, fortalte for Børn. Ny Samling. Tredie Hefte) (1841), C.A. Reitzel Publisher, collection of 4 short stories:
 "Ole Lukøje", "Rosen-Alfen", "Svinedrengen", "Boghveden"
 Vandring gjennem Opera-Galleriet (1841), opera
 "Fortale af H. C. Andersen, til 'Konstnerfamilien'" (1841), article
  'Mohammeds Fødselsdag' og 'Jernbanen'  (1841), travelogue
 Tre romerske Drenge (1842), travelogue
 A Poet's Bazaar (En Digters Bazar) (1842), C.A. Reitzel Publishers, travelogue
 New Fairy Tales. First Volume. First Collection (Nye Eventyr. Første Bind. Første Samling) (1843), C.A. Reitzel Publishers, collection of 4 short stories:
 "Engelen", "Nattergalen", "Kjærestefolkene [Toppen og bolden]", "Den grimme ælling"
 Picture Book without Pictures. Second Enhanced Edition (Billedbog uden Billeder. Anden forøgede Udgave) (1844), collection of 26 short stories from A Picture Book without Pictures series:
 "Første Aften" (#1), "Anden Aften" (#2), "Tredie Aften" (#3), "Fjerde Aften" (#4), "Femte Aften" (#5), "Sjette Aften" (#6), "Syvende Aften" (#7), "Ottende Aften" (#8), "Niende Aften" (#9), "Tiende Aften" (#10), "Ellevte Aften" (#11), "Tolvte Aften" (#12), "Trettende Aften" (#13), "Fjortende Aften" (#14), "Femtende Aften" (#15), "Sextende Aften" (#16), "Syttende Aften" (#17), "Attende Aften" (#18), "Nittende Aften" (#19), "Tyvende Aften" (#20), "En og tyvende Aften" (#21), "To og tyvende Aften" (#22), "Fire og tyvende Aften" (#24), "Fem og tyvende Aften" (#25), "Syv og tyvende Aften" (#27), "Een og tredivte Aften" (#31)
 New Fairy Tales. First Volume. Second Collection (Nye Eventyr. Første Bind. Anden Samling) (1844), C.A. Reitzel Publishers, collection of 2 short stories:
 "Grantræet", "Snedronningen"
 The king dreams (Kongen drømmer) (1844), play
 Digte af H. C. Andersen IV (1844), collection of 5 poems
 Digte af H. C. Andersen V (1844), collection of 4 poems
 Smaavers af H. C. Andersen II (1844), collection of 5 poems
 Sange af Vaudevillen: 'Fuglen i Pæretræet (1844), collection of 6 poems
 Bertel Thorvaldsen. En biographisk Skizze (1844), biography
 New Fairy Tales. First Volume. Third Collection (Nye Eventyr. Første Bind. Tredie Samling) (1845), C.A. Reitzel Publishers, collection of 5 short stories:
 "Elverhøi", "De røde Skoe", "Springfyrene", "Hyrdinden og Skorstensfejeren", "Holger Danske"
 The flower of happiness (Lykkens Blomst) (1845), C.A. Reitzel Publishers, magic comedy in two act
 Henriette Hanck (1845), biography
 To Billeder fra Kjøbenhavn (1846), collection of 2 short stories:
 "Fra et Vindue i Vartou", "Et Billede fra Castelsvolden"
 Little Kirsten (Liden Kirsten) (1846), original romantic ballad opera in one act, published at the author's expense
 Poems old and new (Digte, gamle og nye) (1846), C.A. Reitzel Publishers, collection of 92 poems
 Picture Book without Pictures. Full Version (Billedbog uden Billeder. Komplet udgave) (1847), collection of 33 short stories from A Picture Book without Pictures series:
 "Første Aften" (#1), "Anden Aften" (#2), "Tredie Aften" (#3), "Fjerde Aften" (#4), "Femte Aften" (#5), "Sjette Aften" (#6), "Syvende Aften" (#7), "Ottende Aften" (#8), "Niende Aften" (#9), "Tiende Aften" (#10), "Ellevte Aften" (#11), "Tolvte Aften" (#12), "Trettende Aften" (#13), "Fjortende Aften" (#14), "Femtende Aften" (#15), "Sextende Aften" (#16), "Syttende Aften" (#17), "Attende Aften" (#18), "Nittende Aften" (#19), "Tyvende Aften" (#20), "En og tyvende Aften" (#21), "To og tyvende Aften" (#22), "Tre og tyvende Aften" (#23), "Fire og tyvende Aften" (#24), "Fem og tyvende Aften" (#25), "Sex og tyvende Aften" (#26), "Syv og tyvende Aften" (#27), "Otte og tyvende Aften" (#28), "Ni og tyvende Aften" (#29), "Tredivte Aften" (#30), "Een og tredivte Aften" (#31), "To og tredivte Aften" (#32), "Tre og tredivte Aften" (#33)
 Fortællinger og Digte af H. C. Andersen (1847), collection of 2 short stories and 2 poems:
 "To og tredivte Aften" (A Picture Book without Pictures series #32), "Pigen fra Albano (Madonna! jeg næppe af glæde kan tale,)" (poem), "Tre og tredivte Aften" (A Picture Book without Pictures series #33), "Romance (Langt, langt fra hjemmets kyst)" (poem)
 Ahasverus (1847), C.A. Reitzel Publishers, philosophical-historical work in the form of a lyrical dialogue
 The Fairy Tale of My Life (Mit eget Eventyr uden Digtning) (1847), autobiography, printed as vols. I and II of Andersen's Gesammelte Werke – according to the contract planned to comprise 30 volumes, but with later supplements the work grew to a total of 50 volumes – which began to appear in 1847; Carl B. Lorck Publishers, Leipzig. The Danish original manuscript was first published by Helge Topsøe-Jensen: Mit eget Eventyr uden Digtning), Nyt Nordisk Forlag/Arnold Busck Publishers, Copenhagen, 1942.
 New Fairy Tales. Second Volume. First Collection (Nye Eventyr. Andet Bind. Første Samling) (1847), C.A. Reitzel Publishers, collection of 5 short stories:
 "Den gamle Gadeløgte", "Nabofamilierne", "Stoppenaalen", "Lille Tuk", "Skyggen"
 The Two Baronesses (De to Baronesser) (1848), C.A. Reitzel Publishers, novel in three parts (first published in England, translated by Charles Beckwith Lohmeyer. Richard Bentley, London)
 New Fairy Tales. Second Volume. Second Collection (Nye Eventyr. Andet Bind. Anden Samling) (1848), C.A. Reitzel Publishers, collection of 6 short stories:
 "Det gamle Huus", "Vanddraaben", "Den lille Pige med Svovlstikkerne", "Den lykkelige Familie", "Historien om en moder", "Flipperne"
 The Dannevirke of art (Kunstens Dannevirke) (1848), C.A. Reitzel Publishers, play, prelude at the centenary celebrations of the Royal Danish Theatre in 1848 [NB! Dannevirke: historical fortifications south of Denmark]
 "De Svenske i Fyen i Sommeren 1848" (1848), article
 Fairy-tales (Eventyr) (1849), C.A. Reitzel Publishers (with 125 illustrations based on the original drawings by Vilhelm Pedersen, woodcuts by Ed. Kretzschmar [in Leipzig], 1850; appeared in five booklets from August to December 1849), first illustrated book edition in Denmark, collection of 43 short stories:
 "Lille Tuk", "Grantræet", "Svinedrengen", "Kjærestefolkene [Toppen og bolden]", "Hyldemoer", "Elverhøi", "Snedronningen", "Holger Danske", "Ole Lukøje", "Tommelise", "Lille Claus og store Claus", "Den standhaftige tinsoldat", "Boghveden", "Den lille havfrue", "Den uartige Dreng", "Paradisets have", "Gaaseurten", "Den grimme ælling", "Storkene", "Engelen", "Hyrdinden og Skorstensfejeren", "Prinsessen paa Ærten", "Fyrtøiet", "De røde Skoe", "Reisekammeraten", "Springfyrene", "Nattergalen", "Rosen-Alfen", "Den flyvende Kuffert", "Den gamle Gadeløgte", "Den lille Pige med Svovlstikkerne", "De vilde svaner", "Den lille Idas blomster", "Nabofamilierne", "Klokken", "Stoppenaalen", "Skyggen", "Det gamle Huus", "Hørren", "Vanddraaben", "Den lykkelige Familie", "Historien om en moder", "Flipperne"
 6 character studies composed for pianoforte (6 Characteerstykker componerede som Studier for Pianoforte) (1849), C.C. Lose & Delbanco, Copenhagen, by J.P.E. Hartmann, booklets 1–2, opus 50 (with introductory verses by Hans Christian Andersen for each piano composition)
 6 indledende Smaavers (1849), collection of 6 poems
 The wedding at Lake Como (Brylluppet ved Como-Søen) (1849), C.A. Reitzel Publishers, opera in three acts, this material is taken from some chapters in Manzoni's novel I promessi sposi More than pearls and gold (Meer end Perler og Guld) (1849), C.A. Reitzel Publishers, a fairy-tale comedy in four acts. A free adaptation from F. Raimund and the "Arabian Nights"
 "'Midsommar-Resan'. En Vall-Fart af Förf. til Teckningar ur hvardagslifvet" (1849), article

 1850s 

 6 indledende Smaavers II (1850), collection of 6 poems
 A Christmas greeting for adults and children from Danish composers (Julehilsen til Store og Smaae fra danske Componister) (1850), C.C. Lose & Delbanco, Copenhagen, contains 6 little verses by Hans Christian Andersen as introductions to each of the 6 piano compositions (by the composers Niels W. Gade, J.P.E. Hartmann, Eduard Helsted, Emil Hornemann the Elder, H.S. Paulli and Anton Rée), book of 6 sheet music with poems
 Den nye Barselstue (1850), C.A. Reitzel Publishers, literally the new lying-in room, original comedy in one act [NB. This defies translation. The title alludes to a comedy by Holberg ridiculing the Danish practice of paying visits to a new mother shortly after the birth of her child]
 A night in Roskilde (En Nat i Roeskilde) (1850), C.A. Reitzel Publishers, a vaudeville in one act, based on Warin Charles Varin and Lefèvre's "Une chambre à deux lits"
 Ole Lukoie (Ole Lukøje) (1850), C.A. Reitzel Publishers, fairy tale comedy in three acts
 Patriotic verses and songs from the War (Fædrelandske Vers og Sange under Krigen) (1851), published together at the author's expense for the benefit of the wounded and bereaved, the Three Years' War 1848–50 over the duchies of Schleswig and Holstein, collection of 14 poems
 The Elder Tree Mother (Hyldemoer) (1851), C.A. Reitzel Publishers, fantasy in one act
 "Et Par Ord om 'Hyldemoer'" (1851), article
 I Sverrig (1851), C.A. Reitzel Publishers, travelogue, pictures of Sweden [travel book], translated by Charles Beckwith Lohmeyer. Richard Bentley, London
 Stories. First Collection (Historier. Første Samling) (1852), C.A. Reitzel Publishers, collection of 7 short stories:
 "Aarets Historie", "Verdens deiligste Rose", "Et Billede fra Castelsvolden", "Paa den yderste Dag", "Det er ganske vist!", "Svanereden", "Et godt Humeur"
 Stories. Second Collection (Historier. Anden Samling) (1852), C.A. Reitzel Publishers, collection of 5 short stories:
 "Hjertesorg", "'Alt paa sin rette Plads!'", "Nissen hos Spekhøkeren", "Om Aartusinder", "Under Piletræet"
 "The Last Pearl" ("Den sidste Perle") (1853), uncollected fairy tale
 "A Leaf from Heaven" ("Et Blad fra Himlen") (1853), uncollected fairy tale
 The Nix (Nøkken) (1853), C.A. Reitzel Publishers, opera in one act
 Jens Adolph Jerichau og Elisabeth Jerichau, født Baumann (1853), biography
 Samlede Skrifter af H. C. Andersen. Første Bind (1853), essays
 Samlede Skrifter af H. C. Andersen. Andet Bind (1853), essays
 Samlede Skrifter af H. C. Andersen. Tredie Bind (1853), essays
 Samlede Skrifter af H. C. Andersen. Fjerde Bind (1853), essays
 Silkeborg (1853), travelogue
 Fuglen i Pæretræet (1854), play
 Indledning til Carnevalet (1854), play
 Samlede Skrifter af H. C. Andersen. Femte Bind (1854), essays
 Samlede Skrifter af H. C. Andersen. Sjette Bind (1854), essays
 Samlede Skrifter af H. C. Andersen. Syvende Bind (1854), essays
 Samlede Skrifter af H. C. Andersen. Ottende Bind (1854), essays
 Samlede Skrifter af H. C. Andersen. Niende Bind (1854), essays
 Samlede Skrifter af H. C. Andersen. Tiende Bind (1854), essays
 Samlede Skrifter af H. C. Andersen. Ellevte Bind (1854), essays
 Samlede Skrifter af H. C. Andersen. Tolvte Bind (1854), essays
 Samlede Skrifter af H. C. Andersen. Trettende Bind (1854), essays
 Samlede Skrifter af H. C. Andersen. Fjortende Bind (1854), essays
 Samlede Skrifter af H. C. Andersen. Femtende Bind (1854), essays
 Samlede Skrifter af H. C. Andersen. Sextende Bind (1854), essays
 Stories (Historier) (1855), with 55 illustrations based on the original drawings by V. Pedersen, woodcuts by Ed. Kretzschmar [a reprint of the stories printed previously, but the first edition of the stories with V.P.'s illustrations], the estate and heirs of C.A. Reitzel, collection of 22 short stories:
 "Ib og lille Christine", "Klods-Hans", "Fra et Vindue i Vartou", "Den gamle Gravsteen", "Fem fra en Ærtebælg", "'Hun duede ikke'", "Pengegrisen", "Ved det yderste Hav", "To Jomfruer", "'Der er Forskjel'", "Aarets Historie", "Verdens deiligste Rose", "Et Billede fra Castelsvolden", "Paa den yderste Dag", "Det er ganske vist!", "Svanereden", "Et godt Humeur", "Hjertesorg", "'Alt paa sin rette Plads!'", "Nissen hos Spekhøkeren", "Om Aartusinder", "Under Piletræet"
 Indledende Smaavers (1855), collection of 6 poems
 Six short pieces for pianoforte (Novellette i sex Smaastykker for Pianoforte) (1855), C.C. Lose & Delbanco, by J.P.E. Hartmann with introductory verses by Hans Christian Andersen for each of the 6 piano compositions
 A village story (En Landsbyhistorie) (1855), the estate and heirs of C.A. Reitzel, popular play in five acts based on S.H. Mosenthal's "Der Sonnenwendhof" with additional choruses and songs
 The Fairy Tale of My Life (Mit Livs Eventyr) (1855), autobiography, published as vols. 21 and 22 in the Danish edition of Andersen's Samlede Skrifter (Collected writings); also published as a separate book edition. The estate and heirs of C.A. Reitzel, 1855. Translated by R.P. Keigwin. With Illustrations in Colour by Niels Larsen Stevns. British Book Centre, New York/ Maxsons & Co., London/ Nyt Nordisk Forlag. Arnold Busck Publishers, Copenhagen, 1954.
 Samlede Skrifter af H. C. Andersen. Syttende Bind (1855), essays
 Samlede Skrifter af H. C. Andersen. Attende Bind (1855), essays
 Samlede Skrifter af H. C. Andersen. Nittende Bind (1855), essays
 Samlede Skrifter af H. C. Andersen. Tyvende Bind (1855), essays
 Samlede Skrifter af H. C. Andersen. Eet og Tyvende og To og Tyvende Bind (1855), essays
 "Berigtigelse af en Fejl i 'Mit Livs Eventyr'" (1856), article
 To be or not to be? (At være eller ikke være) (1857), novel in three parts, issued as vol. 23 of Samlede Skrifter (Collected works), the estate and heirs of C.A. Reitzel, 1857. Translated by Anne Bushby. Richard Bentley, London, 1857.
 "Af et Brev fra London. (Juli 1857)" (1857), article
 Samlede Skrifter af H. C. Andersen. Tre og Tyvende Bind (1857), essays
 New Fairy Tales and Stories. First Series. First Collection (Nye Eventyr og Historier. Første Række. Første Samling) (1858), the estate and heirs of C.A. Reitzel, collection of 6 short stories:
 "Suppe paa en Pølsepind", "Flaskehalsen", "Pebersvendens Nathue", "'Noget'", "Det gamle Egetræes sidste Drøm", "ABC-Bogen"
 New Fairy Tales and Stories. First Series. Second Collection (Nye Eventyr og Historier. Første Række. Anden Samling) (1858), the estate and heirs of C.A. Reitzel, collection of 3 short stories:
 "Dynd-Kongens Datter", "Hurtigløberne", "Klokkedybet"
 Ragaz (Bad-Pfäffers) (1858), travelogue
 New Fairy Tales and Stories. First Series. Third Collection (Nye Eventyr og Historier. Første Række. Tredie Samling) (1859), C.A. Reitzel Publishers, collection of 6 short stories:
 "Vinden fortæller om Valdemar Daae og hans Døttre", "Pigen, som traadte paa Brødet", "Taarnvægteren Ole", "Anne Lisbeth", "Børnesnak", "Et stykke Perlesnor"
 New Fairy Tales and Stories. First Series. Fourth Collection (Nye Eventyr og Historier. Første Række. Fjerde Samling) (1859), C.A. Reitzel Publishers, collection of 5 short stories:
 "Pen og Blækhuus", "Barnet i Graven", "Gaardhanen og Veirhanen", "'Deilig!'", "En Historie fra Klitterne"
 Skagen (1859), travelogue

 1860s 

 Johan Peter Emilius Hartmann (1860), biography
 Et Besøg hos Charles Dickens i Sommeren 1857 (1860), travelogue
 Liden Kirstens Grav (1860), travelogue
 Passionskuespillet i Oberammergau i 1860 (1860), travelogue
 New Fairy Tales and Stories. Second Series. First Collection (Nye Eventyr og Historier. Anden Række. Første Samling) (1861), C.A. Reitzel Publishers, collection of 7 short stories:
 "Tolv med Posten", "Skarnbassen", "Hvad Fatter gjør, det er altid det Rigtige", "De Vises Steen", "Sneemanden", "I Andegaarden", "Det nye Aarhundredes Musa"
 New Fairy Tales and Stories. Second Series. Second Collection (Nye Eventyr og Historier. Anden Række. Anden Samling) (1861), C.A. Reitzel Publishers, collection of 4 short stories:
 "Iisjomfruen", "Sommerfuglen", "Psychen", "Sneglen og Rosenhækken"
 "Protest til Redacteur Ploug mod Clemens Petersens Anmeldelse i 'Fædrelandet' af af Carit Etlars Folkekomedie 'Hr. Lauge med den" (1861), article
 "Brev fra Prof. H. C. Andersen, dateret Florents den 3 juni" (1861), article
 Brudstykke af en Reise i Schweitz (Meddeelt til Billedet: Løven ved Luzern) (1861), travelogue
 Fairy Tales and Stories. First Volume (Eventyr og Historier. Første Bind) (1862), collection of 27 short stories:
 "Grantræet", "Fyrtøiet", "Lille Claus og store Claus", "Prinsessen paa Ærten", "Den lille Idas blomster", "Tommelise", "Den uartige Dreng", "Reisekammeraten", "Den lille havfrue", "Gaaseurten", "Den standhaftige tinsoldat", "De vilde svaner", "Paradisets have", "Den flyvende Kuffert", "Storkene", "Metalsvinet", "Venskabs-Pagten", "En Rose fra Homers Grav", "Ole Lukøje", "Rosen-Alfen", "Svinedrengen", "Boghveden", "Engelen", "Nattergalen", "Kjærestefolkene [Toppen og bolden]", "Den grimme ælling", "Snedronningen"
 Digte af H. C. Andersen VI (1862), collection of 4 poems
 "Brudstykke af et Brev fra Spanien" (1862), article
 "Brudstykke af et Brev, dateret Valencia, den 18de September" (1862), article
 "Brudstykke af et Brev dateret Granada den 12. Oktober" (1862), article
 "Brudstykke af et Brev dateret Tanger den 3. November" (1862), article
 "Brudstykke af et Brev dateret Madrid den 18. December" (1862), article
 Digteren Bernhard Severin Ingemann (1862), biography
 Fairy Tales and Stories. Second Volume (Eventyr og Historier. Andet Bind) (1863), collection of 48 short stories and 1 article:
 "Bedstemoder", "Lille Tuk", "Fugl Phønix", "Hyldemoer", "Stoppenaalen", "Klokken", "Elverhøi", "De røde Skoe", "Springfyrene", "Hyrdinden og Skorstensfejeren", "Holger Danske", "Den lille Pige med Svovlstikkerne", "Et Billede fra Castelsvolden", "Den gamle Gadeløgte", "Nabofamilierne", "Skyggen", "Det gamle Huus", "Vanddraaben", "Den lykkelige Familie", "Historien om en moder", "Flipperne", "Hørren", "En Historie", "Den stumme Bog", "'Der er Forskjel'", "Den gamle Gravsteen", "Verdens deiligste Rose", "Aarets Historie", "Paa den yderste Dag", "Det er ganske vist!", "Svanereden", "Et godt Humeur", "Hjertesorg", "'Alt paa sin rette Plads!'", "Nissen hos Spekhøkeren", "Om Aartusinder", "Under Piletræet", "Fem fra en Ærtebælg", "Klods-Hans", "'Hun duede ikke'", "Ib og lille Christine", "To Jomfruer", "Ved det yderste Hav", "Pengegrisen", "'Ærens Tornevei'", "Jødepigen", "Flaskehalsen", "De Vises Steen", "Bemærkninger" (article)
 Digte fra Spanien (1863), collection of 6 poems
 "Bemærkninger" (1863), article
 Samlede Skrifter af H. C. Andersen. Fire og Tyvende Bind (1863), essays
 In Spain (I Spanien) (1863), C.A. Reitzel Publishers, published as vol. 24 af Samlede Skrifter(Collected works), travelogue
 He is not [nobly] born (Han er ikke født) (1864), C.A. Reitzel Publishers, original comedy in two acts
 On Langebro (Paa Langebro) (1864), C.A. Reitzel Publishers, popular comedy with choruses and songs in four acts [not identical with the students' farce Langebro, which Andersen wrote in 1837 for the Students' Association, but did not have printed], based on Musæus [Musäus] and Kotzebue (The fairy tale "Den stumme Kjærlighed" (Mute love))
 New Fairy Tales and Stories. Second Series. Third Collection (Nye Eventyr og Historier. Anden Række. Tredie Samling) (1865), C.A. Reitzel Publishers, collection of 7 short stories:
 "Lygtemændene ere i Byen, sagde Mosekonen", "Veirmøllen", "Sølvskillingen", "Bispen paa Børglum og hans Frænde", "I Børnestuen", "Guldskat", "Stormen flytter Skilt"
 When the Spaniards Were Here (Da Spanierne var her) (1865), C.A. Reitzel Publishers, original romantic comedy in three acts
 The Raven (Ravnen) (1865), C.A. Reitzel Publishers, fairy tale opera in four acts, new version of text and music from the eponymous ballad opera from 1832
 New Fairy Tales and Stories. Second Series. Fourth Collection (Nye Eventyr og Historier. Anden Række. Fjerde Samling) (1866), C.A. Reitzel Publishers, collection of 6 short stories:
 "Gjemt er ikke glemt", "Portnerens Søn", "Flyttedagen", "Sommergjækken", "Moster", "Skrubtudsen"
 6 Smaarim (1866), collection of 6 poems
 Photographs of groups of children (Fotograferede Børnegrupper) (1866), 6 photos by Harald Paetz, with rhymes added by Professor Hans Christian Andersen (published by the photographer)
 "Uddrag af et Brev, dateret Leyden, den 17. Marts" (1866), article
 "Af et Brev fra H. C. Andersen, dateret Lissabon, den 16. Mai" (1866), article
 "Uddrag af et Brev, omhandlende Rejsen til Portugal" (1866), article
 "Fra H. C. Andersens Reise. Brev dateret Setubal den 19de Juni 1866" (1866), article
 "Brudstykke af et Brev dateret Cintra den 31. Juli" (1866), article
 Fifteen Fairy Tales and Stories (Femten Eventyr og Historier) (1867), C.A. Reitzel Publishers, with illustrations by Lorenz Frølich [first edition illustrated by Frølich, who took over from Vilhelm Pedersen], collection of 15 short stories:
 "Tolv med Posten", "Barnet i Graven", "Suppe paa en Pølsepind", "Anne Lisbeth", "'Noget'", "Hurtigløberne", "Pebersvendens Nathue", "ABC-Bogen", "Sneemanden", "Klokkedybet", "Skarnbassen", "Psychen", "Hvad Fatter gjør, det er altid det Rigtige", "Børnesnak", "Pen og Blækhuus"
 Smaavers af H. C. Andersen III (1867), collection of 4 poems
 Well-known and forgotten poems (Kjendte og glemte Digte) (1867), C.A. Reitzel Publishers, collection of 42 poems
 Kong Saul (1867), opera
 "Svarskrivelse til Odense Kommunalbestyrelse paa Indbydelsen til at komme til Odense den 6/12 for at modtage Diplomet som Æresbor" (1867), article
 "Takketale ved Overrækkelsen af Diplomet" (1867), article
 "Brev, dateret København d. 2den Januar 1867. (poetico for: 1868)" (1867), article
 "Takskrivelse til Studenterforeningen" (1867)
 I Vetturinens Vogn (1868), play
 "Bemærkninger" (1868), article
 Samlede Skrifter af H. C. Andersen. Fem og Tyvende Bind (1868), essays
 Samlede Skrifter af H. C. Andersen. Sex og Tyvende Bind (1868), essays
 Samlede Skrifter af H. C. Andersen. Syv og Tyvende Bind (1868), essays
 Samlede Skrifter af H. C. Andersen. Otte og Tyvende Bind (1868), essays
 A Visit to Portugal (Et Besøg i Portugal 1866) (1868), C.A. Reitzel Publishers, travelogue, printed with several minor travel sketches and two biographical essays (on B.S. Ingemann and J.P.E. Hartmann) in vol. 28 af Samlede Skrifter (Collected works) under the common title Reiseskizzer og Pennetegninger (Travel sketches and ink drawings)
 Three new Fairy Tales and Stories (Tre nye Eventyr og Historier) (1869), C.A. Reitzel Publishers, collection of 3 short stories:
 "Hønse-Grethes Familie", "Hvad Tidselen oplevede", "Hvad man kan hitte paa"
 "The Court Cards" ("Herrebladene") (1869), uncollected fairy tale
 "Et Brev fra Etatsraad H. C. Andersen til Udgiveren" (1869), article
 I Jurabjergene (1869), travelogue

 1870s 

 Lucky Peer (Lykke-Peer) (1870), C.A. Reitzel Publishers, novel
 Fairy Tales and Stories. Third Volume (Eventyr og Historier. Tredie Bind) (1870), collection of 24 short stories:
 "Suppe paa en Pølsepind", "Pebersvendens Nathue", "'Noget'", "Det gamle Egetræes sidste Drøm", "ABC-Bogen", "Dynd-Kongens Datter", "Hurtigløberne", "Klokkedybet", "Den onde Fyrste", "Vinden fortæller om Valdemar Daae og hans Døttre", "Pigen, som traadte paa Brødet", "Taarnvægteren Ole", "Anne Lisbeth", "Børnesnak", "Et stykke Perlesnor", "Pen og Blækhuus", "Barnet i Graven", "Gaardhanen og Veirhanen", "'Deilig!'", "En Historie fra Klitterne", "Marionetspilleren", "To Brødre", "Den gamle Kirkeklokke", "Tolv med Posten"
 "Danish Popular Legends" ("Danske Folkesagn") (1870), uncollected fairy tale
 "Brev dateret Rom, den 5te December 1833" (1870), article
 "Brev dateret Kjøbenhavn, den 15de September 1836" (1870), article
 Fairy Tales and Stories. Fourth Volume (Eventyr og Historier. Fjerde Bind) (1871), collection of 27 short stories:
 "Skarnbassen", "Hvad Fatter gjør, det er altid det Rigtige", "Sneemanden", "I Andegaarden", "Det nye Aarhundredes Musa", "Iisjomfruen", "Sommerfuglen", "Psychen", "Sneglen og Rosenhækken", "Lygtemændene ere i Byen, sagde Mosekonen", "Veirmøllen", "Sølvskillingen", "Bispen paa Børglum og hans Frænde", "I Børnestuen", "Guldskat", "Stormen flytter Skilt", "Theepotten", "Folkesangens Fugl", "De smaa Grønne", "Nissen og Madamen", "Peiter, Peter og Peer", "Gjemt er ikke glemt", "Portnerens Søn", "Flyttedagen", "Sommergjækken", "Moster", "Skrubtudsen"
 The Story of My Life (1871), autobiography, printed as an appendix to Horace Scudder's new edition of Andersen's memoirs, published as part of this edition
 New Fairy Tales and Stories. Third Series. New [first] Collection (Nye Eventyr og Historier. Tredie Række. Ny [første] Samling) (1872), collection of 13 short stories:
 "Gartneren og Herskabet", "Den store Søslange", "'Spørg Amagermo'er!'", "'Dandse, dandse Dukke min!'", "Hvad hele Familien sagde", "Det Utroligste", "Lysene", "Hvem var den Lykkeligste?", "Oldefa'er", "Solskins-Historier", "Ugedagene", "Kometen", "Lykken kan ligge i en Pind"
 New Fairy Tales and Stories. Third Series. Second Collection (Nye Eventyr og Historier. Tredie Række. Anden Samling) (1872), C.A. Reitzel Publishers, collection of 4 short stories:
 "Tante Tandpine", "Krøblingen", "Portnøglen", "Hvad gamle Johanne fortalte" (the last story Andersen wrote)
 Fairy Tales and Stories. New Collection (Eventyr og Historier. Ny Samling) (1872), C.A. Reitzel Publishers, collection of 12 short stories:
 "Kometen", "Ugedagene", "Solskins-Historier", "Oldefa'er", "Hvem var den Lykkeligste?", "Lysene", "Det Utroligste", "Hvad hele Familien sagde", "'Dandse, dandse Dukke min!'", "'Spørg Amagermo'er!'", "Den store Søslange", "Gartneren og Herskabet"
 Smaavers af H. C. Andersen IV (1872), collection of 2 poems
 Nürnberg. En Reise-Erindring fra Foraaret 1872 (1872), travelogue
 Fairy Tales and Stories. Fifth Volume (Eventyr og Historier. Femte Bind) (1874), collection of 25 short stories and 1 article:
 "Bemærkninger til Eventyr og Historier" (article), "Gudfaders Billedbog", "Laserne", "Vænø og Glænø", "Hvem var den Lykkeligste?", "Dryaden", "Hønse-Grethes Familie", "Hvad Tidselen oplevede", "Hvad man kan hitte paa", "Lykken kan ligge i en Pind", "Kometen", "Ugedagene", "Solskins-Historier", "Oldefa'er", "Lysene", "Det Utroligste", "Hvad hele Familien sagde", "'Dandse, dandse Dukke min!'", "'Spørg Amagermo'er!'", "Den store Søslange", "Gartneren og Herskabet", "Loppen og Professoren", "Hvad gamle Johanne fortalte", "Portnøglen", "Krøblingen", "Tante Tandpine"
 "Uddrag af et Brev til Edmund W. Gosse" (1874), article
 "H. C. Andersen og de amerikanske Børn" (1874), article
 "Bemærkninger til Eventyr og Historier" (1874), article
 "Til mine Landsmænd" (1875), article
 "Brev, dateret: Kjøbenhavn, den 5te April 1875, til Redaktøren af 'Søndags-Posten'" (1875), article
 Akrostichon-Gaade. To danske Digteres Navne (1875), satire and humor

 Published posthumously 

1870s
 To Digte af H. C. Andersen (1875), collection of 2 poems
 "Et Curiosum fra 1822" (1875), article
 Festen paa Kenilworth (1876), play
 Samlede Skrifter af H. C. Andersen. Ni og Tyvende Bind (1876), essays
 Samlede Skrifter af H. C. Andersen. Tredivte Bind (1876), essays
 Samlede Skrifter af H. C. Andersen. En og Tredivte Bind (1876), essays
 Samlede Skrifter af H. C. Andersen. To og Tredivte Bind (1876), essays
 H.C. Andersens Samlede Skrifter. Supplement til 'Mit Livs Eventyr' (1877), autobiography
 Tre utrykte Digte af H. C. Andersen (1878), collection of 3 poems
 Samlede Skrifter af H. C. Andersen. Tre og Tredivte Bind (1879), essays

1880s
 H.C. Andersen. Samlede Skrifter. Anden Udgave (1880), essays
 Intermediet til Holbergs: Kilderejsen (1883), play

1910s
 Hr. Rasmussen (1913), play

1920s
 To ukendte Eventyr af H. C. Andersen (1926), collection of 2 short stories:
 "Qvæk", "Skriveren"

1930s
 Sorøe Gang (1935), unfinished novel
 Fragmenter af en ufuldført historisk Roman (1935), unfinished novel
 Christian den Andens Dverg (1935), unfinished novel
 Danmark (1937), play

1940s
 Truth (1940), play
 "Den første Aften" (1943), uncollected fairy tale, A Picture Book without Pictures series #34
 Et Blad, skrevet i Norge (1949), travelogue

1950s
 Tre ufuldførte historiske Digtninge (1955), collection of 3 poems

1960s
 Et Kapitel af en paatænkt historisk Sverigesroman (1964), travelogue

1980s
 Sangerinden (1987), play

2000s
 I Maaneskin (2001), play
 Langebro (2001), play
 Souffleurens Benefice (2001), play
 En Ødeland (2003), play
 Skovcapellet'' (2004), play

References

External links
Works from the Hans Christian Andersen Center

Bibliographies by writer
Bibliographies of Danish writers
Children's literature bibliographies
Bibliography